Te Waikoropupū River, previously known as the Waikoropupū River, is a river of the Tasman Region of New Zealand's South Island. It originates in the Kahurangi National Park and flows generally northeast to reach the Tākaka River close to the town of Tākaka. On its way it passes close to the Te Waikoropupū Springs, which drain into the river and add significantly to its water volume.

See also
List of rivers of New Zealand

References

Rivers of the Tasman District
Rivers of New Zealand